Pavel Sergeyevich Abramov (born 23 April 1979) is a former Russian volleyball player, a former member of Russia men's national volleyball team, a bronze medalist of the 2004 Olympic Games, a silver medalist of the 2002 World Championship and the 2007 World Cup, medalist of the European Championship and World League.

Career
In November 2014 ended his career.

References

External links
 FIVB Profile

1979 births
Living people
Sportspeople from Moscow
Russian men's volleyball players
Volleyball players at the 2004 Summer Olympics
Olympic volleyball players of Russia
Olympic medalists in volleyball
Expatriate volleyball players in Poland
Jastrzębski Węgiel players
Medalists at the 2004 Summer Olympics
Olympic bronze medalists for Russia
Ural Ufa volleyball players
Moscow State University alumni